Charles Penman Scott (1885 – 10 August 1916) was a Scottish footballer who played in the Scottish League for Cowdenbeath as an outside right. He also played for Hearts of Beath and East Fife.

Personal life 
As of 1901, Scott was working as a miner and he later married and had three children. On 9 January 1915, five months after Britain's entry into the First World War, Scott enlisted as a private in the Princess Louise's (Argyll and Sutherland Highlanders). He was appointed lance corporal in November 1915 and was posted to the Western Front the following month, but he was quickly returned to Britain for a hernia operation. Scott returned to the front in March 1916 and was hospitalised with scabies two months later. After his recovery, Scott was killed in action on the Somme on 10 August 1916 and was buried in Gordon Dump Cemetery.

Career statistics

References 

Scottish footballers
Footballers from Fife
Cowdenbeath F.C. players
Scottish Football League players
1885 births
1916 deaths
Association football outside forwards
East Fife F.C. players
British military personnel killed in the Battle of the Somme
British Army personnel of World War I
Argyll and Sutherland Highlanders soldiers
Scottish miners
Hearts of Beath F.C. players
Scottish military personnel
People from Cardenden
Scottish Junior Football Association players